This is a list of Statutory rules made in the Northern Ireland in the year 2013.

1-100

101-200

201-308

See also

List of Acts of the Northern Ireland Assembly from 2013
List of Acts of the Parliament of the United Kingdom from 2013

References

Law of Northern Ireland
Law of the United Kingdom
2013
2013 in British politics
Northern Ireland
Northern Ireland law-related lists